The 2008 Dally M Awards were presented on Tuesday 9 September 2008 at the Hordern Pavilion in Sydney and broadcast on Fox Sports.

Dally M Medal

Dally M Player of the Year: Matt Orford

Player votes tally – Top 10

Dally M Awards
The Dally M Awards were, as usual, conducted at the close of the regular season and hence do not take games played in the finals series into account. Billy Slater would have won the award had it not been for a one-week suspension for an on-field fight that occurred late in the season which deducted three votes from his tally. Some experts called for a change in the rules claiming he deserved the award for being the best player that season despite the suspension but this never eventuated.

Team of the Year

See also
Dally M Awards
Dally M Medal
National Rugby League season 2008

Footnotes

Dally M Awards
Dally M Awards
Dally M Awards